The São Francisco River is a river of Paraná state in southern Brazil. Together with the Marrecas River it is the source of the Belo River in Prudentópolis.

See also
List of rivers of Paraná

References

Rivers of Paraná (state)